Harold Edwin Umbarger (17 July 1921, Shelby, Ohio – 15 November 1999, Carmel, Indiana) was an American bacteriologist and biochemist.

Biography
H. Edwin Umbarger grew up in Mansfield, Ohio and graduated from Mansfield Senior High School in 1939. At Ohio University he graduated with a bachelor's degree in chemistry in 1943 and a master's degree in zoology in 1944. For two years from 1944 to 1946 he served in the U.S. Navy as a hospital corpsman. In 1945 he served aboard the USS Rescue. In 1950 he received a Ph.D. in bacteriology from Harvard University. His doctoral thesis, supervised by J. Howard Mueller, is entitled Studies on the Interactions Involved in the Biosynthetic Mechanisms of Isoleucine and Valine in Escherichia Coli. From 1950 to 1959 Umbarger did research at Harvard. From 1957 to 1960 he was an assistant professor of bacteriology and Immunology at Harvard Medical School, but he was untenured. For the academic year 1959–1960, on leave of absence from Harvard, he worked at several laboratories in England. From 1960 to 1964 he held the appointment of Staff Investigator at the Cold Spring Harbor Laboratory. At Purdue University he was appointed in 1964 a full professor and in 1970 Wright Distinguished Professor of Biological Sciences. He held that professorship until his retirement.

Umbarger was a leading expert on biosynthesis of amino acids in bacteria. He is perhaps best known as the co-discoverer, with Edward A. Adelberg in 1953, of feedback inhibition in the metabolism of valine and isoleucine. Feedback inhibition in biochemistry had been reported in an almost unknown paper a decade earlier by Zacharias Dische.

While he was still a student, Umbarger married Merle Gladys Abele (1922–1993). They had three daughters. In 1995 he married his second wife.

Awards and honors
 1963 — Guggenheim Fellowship.
 1971 — Elected a Member of the American Academy of Arts and Sciences.
 1975 — Rosenstiel Award, jointly with Arthur B. Pardee (for independent research).
 1976 — Elected a Member of the National Academy of Sciences.
 1999 — Establishment of H. Edwin Umbarger Distinguished Professorship of Genetics at Purdue University. The first holder of the professorship was Jeffrey Bennetzen, succeeded (in 2012) by Stanton B. Galvin.

Selected publications

References

American biochemists
American bacteriologists
Ohio University alumni
Harvard University alumni
Purdue University faculty
Fellows of the American Academy of Arts and Sciences
Members of the United States National Academy of Sciences
1921 births
1999 deaths
United States Navy personnel of World War II